Bigg Boss Bangla 2 was the second season of the Bangali version of the Indian reality show Bigg Boss.

Housemates

Original entrants
 Shilajit Majumder – Singer.
 Mikhail Bora – Brother of Sheena Bora.
 Apurbo Roy – Comedian.
 Joyjit Banerjee – Television actor.
 Mainak Banerjee – Actor.
 Kamalika Banerjee – Actress.
 Rii Sen – Actress.
 Priya Paul – Actress.
 Srabanti Chatterjee – Actress.
 Aditi Chakraborty – Choreographer.
 Priti Biswas – Television actress.
 Sandy Rong – Choreographer.

Wild card entrants
Debolina dutta - Actress
Ena Saha - Actress
Joey

Guest Entrant
 Puja Banerjee – Television actress.

Housemates Status

Nominations Table

Nomination notes
: Ena was nominated by Bigg Boss after failing the secret task given to her when she entered on Day 3 as the first wild card entrant.

References

2016 Indian television seasons
Colors Bangla original programming